John Spooner B.Juris, LLB (Monash) (born 1946) is an Australian journalist and illustrator who regularly contributed to The Age newspaper.

John Spooner was born in Melbourne in 1946. He practised as a lawyer for three years before he commenced drawing for The Age in 1974, finally leaving the law altogether in 1977 to draw full-time for the newspaper.

Spooner has received various awards for excellence in journalism. Between 1985 and 1986 Spooner was awarded five Stanley Awards, including the Black and White Artist of the Year gold Stanley Award. In 1994 Spooner was awarded two Walkley Awards for Best Illustration and Best Cartoon. Spooner's works are represented in the Collections of The National Gallery of Australia, National Library of Australia, The National Gallery of Victoria, The Victorian State Library, The Melbourne Cricket Club Museum, public and private collections throughout Australia and internationally.

His publications include the book A Spooner in the Works, published in 1999 by Text Publishing, comprising cartoons, prints and paintings; and Taxing Air: Facts and Fallacies about Climate Change, which he co-authored with Prof. Robert Carter, William Kininmonth, Martin Feil, Prof. Stewart W. Franks and Bryan Leyland; published by Kelpie Press in 2013.

Spooner's credits include five Stanley Awards, three Walkley Awards, the joint winner of the 1986 Fremantle Print Award<ref>Print Matters 30 Years of the Shell Fremantle Print Award"'  Holly Story ..et al 2005 FAC </ref> as well as the 2002 Graham Perkin Australian Journalist of the Year Award.

He left The Age in May 2016 along with others made redundant by Fairfax Media. In 2018 he published What the Hell Was He Thinking? John Spooner's Guide to the 21st Century'', a collection of his 21st-century work annotated with his own commentary.

References

External links
 Artwork by John Spooner
 2001 Walkley Award – John Spooner for 'Moolah Ruse'
 John Spooner – 27 June 2004 article from The Age
 John Spooner cartoon collection, 1989–2000 – held and digitised by the National Library of Australia

Australian editorial cartoonists
1946 births
Living people
People educated at Wesley College (Victoria)
Australian journalists
Australian printmakers
Quadrant (magazine) people